Egyptian Natural Gas Company (GASCO) is a subsidiary of the Egyptian Natural Gas Holding Company, operating in the field of natural gas transmission, distribution and processing. The company was established in March 1997. The national gas grid has extended to neighboring countries through the Arab Gas Pipeline.

Ownership 
The main shareholder is the Egyptian Holding Company for Natural Gas with 70% of shares. Petrojet and Egypt Gas own 15% of shares both.

See also

 Energy in Egypt

References

External links

Oil and gas companies of Egypt
Energy companies established in 1997
Non-renewable resource companies established in 1997
Government-owned companies of Egypt
Egyptian companies established in 1997